Marinus Bester (born 16 January 1969) is a German former professional footballer who played as a striker.

Coaching career

Hamburger SV
From February 2002 to August 2004, Bester worked as a press officer for Hamburger SV. Retiring from football in 2003, Bester became Hamburger SV's team manager. From January 2016, he became responsible for coordinating all areas for the U17, U19 and U23s: from team training to additional units, selection measures to the private fields of school, training and consultants. Beside this role, he also functioned as an assistant manager under Christian Titz in 2018. After almost twenty years in various functions, Bester left the club in late January 2019 because he wanted to try something new.

Bester also worked as a youth coach at JFV Ashausen-Scharmbeck/Pattensen for several years during his time in Hamburger SV.

SG Scharmbeck-Pattensen
In November 2012 it was confirmed, that Bester would become the manager of SG Scharmbeck-Pattensen from the 2013-14 season. He left the position in the summer 2015.

TSV Eintracht Hittfeld
In November 2013, Bester became the chairman of his former youth club TSV Eintracht Hittfeld where he also played for the club's oldboys team.

VfL Maschen
From October 2015 until the end of 2017, Bester was the manager of VfL Maschen.

TSV Buchholz 08
In February 2019 it was confirmed, that Bester would take charge of TSV Buchholz 08 from the 2019-20 season. He decided to resign on 5 November 2019.

Honours 
 DFB-Pokal: 1990–91, 1993–94
 UEFA Cup Winners' Cup: 1991–92

References

External links 
 
 

1969 births
Living people
Footballers from Hamburg
German footballers
German football managers
Association football forwards
Bundesliga players
Lüneburger SK players
SV Werder Bremen players
SV Werder Bremen II players
Hamburger SV players
Hamburger SV II players
FC Schalke 04 players
SC Concordia von 1907 players
VfL 93 Hamburg players
West German footballers